The TECHART Magnum is a high-performance luxury SUV based on the Porsche Cayenne.  As with other TECHART products, the Magnum has added features such as a bodykit, interior refitment, and engine and suspension upgrades.

Design and Features

To the standard Porsche Cayenne turbo, TechArt has added a radical bodykit made of PUR-RIM plastic, which includes new high-downforce air dams, side skirts, and aero hood. Also added are 22 inch (556 mm) TechArt Formula II alloy wheels and ContiCrossContact UHP tires, and interior trim of the customer's choice (with the "de Sede of Switzerland" being the highest trim level available, built in cooperation with the furniture manufacturer of the same name). The most significant changes, however, are in the engine and suspension. With the full set of upgrades, the Magnum costs about $204,000 USD; Premier League defender Micah Richards who plays for Manchester City had one imported to the UK.

Specifications
Weight: 
Power:  @ 3440 rpm
Torque:  @ 3440 rpm
Specific output: approx.  per litre
Power-to-weight ratio: approx.  per horsepower

Performance
0-: 4.2 sec
0-: 9.5 sec
Quarter mile: 12.7 sec @ 
Top Speed: 
Braking, -0: 
Braking, -0: 
Lateral acceleration: .90g

References

External links

TechArt official Magnum page

Mid-size sport utility vehicles
All-wheel-drive vehicles
TechArt vehicles